Pimlico Plumbers Ltd v Smith [2018] UKSC 29 is a UK labour law case, concerning the status of a highly paid plumber as, at least, a worker, for the purpose of holiday pay and wages claims.

Facts
Mr Smith claimed wrongful and unfair dismissal, sick pay, holiday pay and shortfall in wages from Pimlico Plumbers Ltd. He did plumbing between August 2005 and April 2011, but his contract said he was self-employed from 2009, while an original document said he was a ‘sub-contracted employee’ in 2005. He wore a uniform with a logo, had a company mobile phone, and a company ID card. Pimlico charged for van rental monthly. Smith only worked for Pimlico, but he sometimes rejected jobs, and decided his own working hours, being unsupervised while plumbing. Normal work hours were 5 days a week, with a 40-hour minimum, although Pimlico had no obligation to provide work every day. After having a heart attack Pimlico no longer engaged him, and he brought his claims claim.

The Tribunal held that Mr Smith was a worker, but not an employee entitled to dismissal protection, but to pay and holiday rights. The Employment Appeal Tribunal also held he was a worker under ERA 1996 s 230(3)(b), WTR 1998 reg 2 and EA 2010 s 83(2)(a) but not an employee. This decision was not appealed.

Judgment

Court of Appeal
Court of Appeal held that Mr Smith was a worker. Sir Terence Etherton MR said both parties agreed the 2009 agreement reflected the current relationship, and the Tribunal was entitled to conclude Smith was obliged to do 40 hours a week, even if not enforced. The notion that there was no legal obligation to provide work was consistent with the reality that there may be no work.

Davis LJ agreed.

Underhill LJ concurred.

Supreme Court
The Supreme Court held that Mr Smith was a worker, entitled to holiday pay and wage protection. He personally performed work, and any contractual right to have a substitute was constrained, not unfettered and discretionary. Pimlico Plumbers was not a client or a customer, since it controlled his work closely, and the Supreme Court declined to answer whether a contract subsisting between assignments indicated less control, as on the facts there was. In his leading judgment, Lord Wilson said the following:

See also

UK labour law

Notes

References

United Kingdom labour case law